is a passenger railway station located in then city of Mitoyo, Kagawa Prefecture, Japan. It is operated by JR Shikoku and has the station number "Y17".

Lines
Hijidai Station is served by the JR Shikoku Yosan Line and is located 50.0 km from the beginning of the line at Takamatsu. Local, Rapid Sunport, and Nanpū Relay services stop at the station. Dosan line local, Rapid Sunport, and Nanpū Relay services stop at the station. In addition, there are two trains a day running a local service on the Seto-Ōhashi Line which stop at the station.

Layout
The station, which is unstaffed, consists of a side platform serving a single track. There is no station building, only a shelter on the platform. A ramp leads up to the platform from the access road. A bike shed is positioned nearby as is a municipal public toilet.

Adjacent stations

History
Hijidai Station was opened by Japanese National Railways (JNR) on 1 October 1957 as an additional stop on the existing Yosan Line. With the privatization of JNR on 1 April 1987, control of the station passed to JR Shikoku.

Surrounding area
K Train World - Railway Museum
Mitoyo Municipal Hiji Elementary School

See also
 List of railway stations in Japan

References

External links

Station timetable

Railway stations in Kagawa Prefecture
Railway stations in Japan opened in 1957
Mitoyo, Kagawa